Sipe or Sipes may refer to:

 Siping (rubber), process to improve traction in slippery conditions 
 Sipe, Estonia, village in Kambja Parish, Tartu County, Estonia
 Sipe Sipe, town in Bolivia
 Swimming-induced pulmonary edema

People with the surname Sipe
 Brian Sipe, American football player 
 Jeff Sipe, American jazz rock drummer
 Richard Sipe (1932–2018), American author
 Russell Sipe, minor-planet discoverer
 Russell Sipe, founder of Computer Gaming World magazine 
 William Allen Sipe (1844–1935), American politician from Pennsylvania

People with the surname Sipes
 Andrew Sipes, American director of Fair Game and other films 
 Andy Sipes, American television actor 
 Connie Sipes, American politician from Indiana
 Gilbert Sipes, a fictional character in the 1995 film Gordy 
 Leonard Sipes or Tommy Collins (1930–2000), American country singer-songwriter

See also

Siping (disambiguation)